A dress rehearsal is a final rehearsal, in costume, of an artistic work just prior to its first public performance.

Dress Rehearsal may also refer to:

Dress Rehearsal (TV special), a 1956 BBC television special starring Eric Sykes as the director
Dress Rehearsal, a series of Canadian television specials which were a preview of the series Drop-In
Dress Rehearsal (album), the 2004 album by singer/songwriter Carolyn Dawn Johnson
The Dress Rehearsal, an episode of the NBC television series Smash

See also 
 Rehearsal (disambiguation) 
 The Rehearsal (disambiguation)